Roswell "Bob" Garst (June 13, 1898 – November 4, 1977) was an American farmer and seed company executive.  He developed hybrid corn seed in 1930 that allowed greater crop yields than open-pollinated corn. He was perhaps most well known for hosting Nikita Khrushchev on his farm in Coon Rapids, Iowa, on September 23, 1959. He sold hybrid seed to the Soviet Union beginning in 1955 and played a role in improving US-Soviet communication.

Biography
Roswell Garst's parents were Edward Garst and Bertha Goodwin. He married Elizabeth Henak on January 31, 1921. Garst was founder of Garst & Thomas Co., which became one of the world's largest producers of hybrid seed corn. In the 1930s, Garst traveled around the Midwest convincing farmers of the benefits of hybrid seed corn. As an international agriculturalist, he encouraged modern farming methods to improve food production in many nations, including the Soviet Union, Chile, Hungary, Germany, and France. Garst was famous for offering (sometimes unsolicited) advice.  When Khrushchev visited Coon Rapids, Garst could not help but discuss the US-Soviet political situation, and told Khrushchev, "You know, for a peasant, you're a damned poor horse trader." Khrushchev apparently liked Garst enough after his previous visits to the Soviet Union to demand that Garst's farm be included on his 1959 tour of the U.S., where he famously stated that Iowa corn was superior to Ukrainian corn. Garst made six trips to the Soviet Union to teach about hybrid seed and farm mechanization. He also sent his sons, including David Garst, on similar trips. Garst, in his own view, was not only an agriculturalist, but also a goodwill ambassador promoting peace during the Cold War. He was diagnosed with cancer of the voice box in 1963. Roswell Garst died in 1977.

Farm
Since Garst's death, his farmstead has been preserved; in 2009, it was placed on the National Register of Historic Places under the title of "Roswell and Elizabeth Garst Farmstead Historic District." The farm was seen as historically significant because of its importance in general American history and because of its place as Garst's home.

References

Further reading and video
 Lee, Harold.  Roswell Garst: A Biography. Ames: Iowa State University Press, 1984.
 Lowitt, Richard and Harold Lee, eds. Letters from an American Farmer: The Eastern European and Russian Correspondence of Roswell Garst.  Dekalb, Illinois: Northern Illinois University Press, 1987.
"Cold War Roadshow* American Experience, PBS, 2014.

External links
 Information on Roswell Garst's home
 http://www.garstseed.com/GarstClient/AboutGarst/heritage.aspx
 Historian Lee Winningham examines US-USSR agricultural exchange during this period
 PBS website for Cold War Roadshow
 Article on Roswell Garst's life at The Biographical Dictionary of Iowa website

1898 births
1977 deaths
Farmers from Iowa
Soviet Union–United States relations
People from Carroll County, Iowa
American horticulturists
Agriculture in the Soviet Union
Nikita Khrushchev